Mark of the Phoenix is a 1958 British drama film directed by Maclean Rogers and starring Julia Arnall, Sheldon Lawrence and Anton Diffring. The screenplay concerns an American jewel thief who comes into possession of a newly developed metal.

Plot summary
A newly developed and valuable metal is stolen and formed into a cigarette case for transportation to East Germany, but an American jewel thief comes into possession of it and finds himself a target.

Cast
 Julia Arnall ...  Petra
 Sheldon Lawrence ...  Chuck Martin
 Anton Diffring ...  Inspector Schell
 Eric Pohlmann ...  Duser
 George Margo ...  Emilson
 Michael Peake ...  Koos
 Martin Miller ...  Brunet
 Roger Delgado ...  Devron
 Bernard Rebel ...  Vachek
 Frederick Schrecker ...  Van de Velde
 Pierre Chaminade ...  Hotel Receptionist
 Corinne Grey ...  Bride
 Jennifer Jayne ...  Airline Ticket Clerk
 Edouard Assaly ...  Cafe Waiter
 Victor Beaumont ...  Travel Clerk
 Norma Parnell ...  2nd Airline Ticket Clerk
 Howard Greene ...  Young Detective
 Tom Clegg ...  Strong Man
Uncredited:
Patrick Troughton ... Police Officer

References

External links

1958 films
1958 drama films
Films directed by Maclean Rogers
British drama films
Films with screenplays by Norman Hudis
1950s English-language films
1950s British films